The Tochikubo Formation is a Jurassic geologic formation in northern Honshu, Japan, dating to the Oxfordian stage of the Late Jurassic. Fossil ornithopod tracks have been reported from the formation. As well as the Bennettitalean Kimuriella.

See also

 List of dinosaur-bearing rock formations
 List of stratigraphic units with ornithischian tracks
 Ornithopod tracks

Footnotes

References
 Weishampel, David B.; Dodson, Peter; and Osmólska, Halszka (eds.): The Dinosauria, 2nd, Berkeley: University of California Press. 861 pp. .

Jurassic System of Asia
Oxfordian Stage